A Simple Thinking About Blood Type is a South Korean 4-panel webtoon by art teacher Park Dong-sun (박동선) under the art name "Real Crazy Man". The webtoon is themed around blood type personality classification and is serialized on Dong-sun's blog. The webtoon has been published in book form and has been adapted into an anime series.

Releases and adaptions
A Simple Thinking About Blood Type was first serialized on Dong-sun's blog as a webtoon.

A short anime adaptation was made by Japanese production houses Assez Finaund Fabric and Feel in 2013, with a second season in January 2015. Zexcs will co-produce a third season, scheduled to air in October 2015. A 4th season has been announced.

Characters
Each of the voice actors also represents their own blood type.

References

External links
 
Official anime website 

2013 anime television series debuts
2015 anime television series debuts
2016 anime television series debuts
2016 Japanese television series endings
2010s webtoons
2013 webtoon debuts
Comics adapted into animated series
Comedy webtoons
Earth Star Entertainment manga
Feel (animation studio)
Kodansha manga
Satirical books
2010s satirical television series
South Korean webtoons
Webtoons in print
Television shows based on South Korean webtoons
Tokyo MX original programming
Yonkoma
Zexcs